32 Aquarii is a binary star system in the zodiac constellation of Aquarius. 32 Aquarii is its Flamsteed designation. It is visible to the naked eye as a dim, white-hued star with an apparent visual magnitude of 5.29. This system is moving away from the Earth with a heliocentric radial velocity of +19 km/s, and is a possible member of the corona of the Ursa Major flow.

This is a single-lined spectroscopic binary with an (assumed) circular orbit having a period of only 7.8 days. Since the sine function can be no larger than one, this provides a lower bound on the true semimajor axis of their orbit.

The primary component is a metallic-line (Am) star with the calcium K line of an A3 star, the hydrogen lines of an F1 star, and the metal lines of an F2 star. It is a sharp-lined, slowly rotating star with a projected rotational velocity of 9.6 km/s and is about 465 million years old. The star has 1.69 times the mass of the Sun and three times the Sun's radius. It is radiating 29 times the luminosity of the Sun from its photosphere at an effective temperature of 7,976 K.

References

A-type subgiants
Am stars
Spectroscopic binaries
Aquarius (constellation)
Durchmusterung objects
Aquarii, 032
209625
108991
8410